Amphibiomermis is a genus of nematodes belonging to the family Mermithidae.

The genus was first described by Artyukhovsky in 1969.

Species:
 Amphibiomermis ghilarovi Pologenzev & Artyukhovsky, 1958
 Amphibiomermis kirjanovae Pologenzev & Artyukhovsky, 1958
 Amphibiomermis kralli Rubtsov, 1973
 Amphibiomermis paramonovi Pologenzev & Artyukhovsky, 1958
 Amphibiomermis polycentrus Rubtsov, 1973
 Amphibiomermis rivalis Artyukhovsky & Khartschenko, 1971

References

Enoplea